Walter Beekerk (1756-1796) was a Dutch painter known by his disposition of lights and shadows.

Sources

1756 births
1796 deaths
18th-century Dutch painters
18th-century Dutch male artists